Elisabeth ("Lisanne") Anne Marie Lejeune (born 28 July 1963) is a former Dutch field hockey defender. She won a bronze medal at the 1988 Summer Olympics, world titles in 
1986 and 1990, European title in 1987, and the Hockey Champions Trophy in 1987.

From 1984 to 1994 she played a total number of 95 international matches for the Netherlands, in which she scored 91 goals, most of them from penalty corners. She missed the 1992 Summer Olympics due to injury.

References

External links
 

1963 births
Living people
Female field hockey defenders
Dutch female field hockey players
Olympic field hockey players of the Netherlands
Field hockey players at the 1988 Summer Olympics
Field hockey players from The Hague
Olympic bronze medalists for the Netherlands
Olympic medalists in field hockey
Medalists at the 1988 Summer Olympics
HGC players
20th-century Dutch women
21st-century Dutch women